Cryptocephalus samniticus is a cylindrical leaf beetle belonging to the family Chrysomelidae and the subfamily Cryptocephalinae. The species was first described by Carlo Leonardi and Davide Sassi in 2001.

This species is found in most of Italy.

References

 Sassi, D. (2001). "Nuove specie del genere Cryptocephalus vicine a Cryptocephalus marginellus (Coleoptera Chrysomelidae)". Memorie della Società entomologica italiana, Genoa. 80: 107–138.

External links
 BioLib
 Culex.biol.uni.wroc.pl
 Fauna Europaea
 Chrysomelidae

samniticus
Beetles of Europe
Beetles described in 2001